The 1986 Montana State Bobcats football team was an American football team that represented Montana State University in the Big Sky Conference (Big Sky) during the 1986 NCAA Division I-AA football season. In their fourth and final season under head coach Dave Arnold, the Bobcats compiled a 3–8 record (2–5 against Big Sky opponents) and tied for sixth out of eight teams in the Big Sky.

Schedule

References

Montana State
Montana State Bobcats football seasons
Montana State Bobcats football